The California State Mining and Mineral Museum is a museum in the state park system of California, United States, home to the state's mineral collection, with minerals and gems from all over the world. The museum interprets the state's mineral resources and mining heritage. It is located in Mariposa, a city in central California, on the Mariposa County fairgrounds.

The museum houses a collection that was created in 1880, with the establishment of the California State Mining Bureau. Henry G. Hanks was the first California State Mineralogist and was tasked with managing the collection. The collection was housed in the Ferry Building in San Francisco until 1983. The collection opened in its current home at the Mariposa County Fairgrounds in 1986. The collection was transferred from the California Department of Conservation to the California Department of Parks & Recreation in 1999. It is the only California State Park without any associated land. The international collection holds over 13,000 minerals, rocks, gems, fossils, and historic artifacts.

Popular exhibits

Exhibits include the crystalline gold Fricot Nugget, weighing 201 troy ounces (6.25 kg), the largest found during the California Gold Rush; a working scale model of a stamp mill over 100 years old, demonstrating the process of extracting gold from quartz rock; and a replica hard rock mine tunnel that allows visitors to better understand California's hard rock mines.

The California State Mining and Mineral Museum has artifacts from the Mother Lode, along with international gems, stones, and other precious artifacts.

Closure proposal
The California Mining and Mineral Museum was one of the 48 California state parks proposed for closure in January 2008 during the Arnold Schwarzenegger Administration as part of a deficit reduction program.

References

External links
Official California State Mining and Mineral Museum website

State parks of California

Mineralogy museums
Mining museums in California
California Gold Rush
Museums in Mariposa County, California
Geology museums in California
Natural history museums in California
Parks in Mariposa County, California
Museums established in 1999
1999 establishments in California